U-117 may refer to one of the following German submarines:

 , a Type UE II submarine launched in 1917 that served in World War I and was surrendered in 1918
 During World War I, Germany also had this submarine with a similar name:
 , a Type UB III submarine launched in 1917 and was surrendered in 1918
 , a Type XB submarine that served in the Second World War and sank on 7 August 1943

Submarines of Germany